Amasi Martirosyan was an Armenian film director, screenwriter and actor.

Biography

Filmography

As actor
Namus (1925) as Smbat
Zare (1927) as Zurba
Khaspush (1928) as Mulla
Zangezur (1938) as Dashnak officer
The Song of First Love (1958) as Guard

As assistant director
Khaspush (1928)
Evil Spirit (1928)
David Bek (1944)
Anahit (1947)

References

External links

Male actors from Yerevan
Film people from Yerevan
1897 births
1971 deaths
20th-century Armenian male actors
Armenian male film actors
Armenian male silent film actors
Armenian screenwriters
Armenian film directors
20th-century screenwriters
Soviet film directors